The Wushan Yangtze River Bridge is an arch bridge, which carries S301 Provincial Road across the Yangtze River near Wushan, Chongqing, China. The bridge is also among the highest in the world however, the reservoir created by the construction of the Three Gorges Dam has increased the height of the water below the bridge, and the full  clearance is no longer visible. The bridge was officially opened to the public on January 8, 2005.

See also
List of longest arch bridge spans
List of highest bridges in the world
Yangtze River bridges and tunnels

References

External links
Highestbridges.com
Arch-bridges.com

Bridges in Chongqing
Bridges over the Yangtze River
Arch bridges in China
Bridges completed in 2005